Menkulas is a small village of about 1,000 inhabitants in the Korçë County, Albania. In the 2015 local government reform it became part of the municipality of Devoll. The inhabitants of Menkulas are Muslim.

The mainstay of the local economy is agriculture.

Notable people 
Dritëro Agolli (1931–2017), an Albanian poet, writer and politician

References

Populated places in Devoll (municipality)
Villages in Korçë County